KOMP (92.3 MHz) is a class-C FM radio station licensed to Las Vegas, Nevada.  KOMP broadcasts an active rock music format.  Its studios are in the unincorporated community of Spring Valley in Clark County and its transmitter is on Potosi Mountain southwest of the Las Vegas Valley.

KOMP broadcasts in HD Radio.

History
The station was originally KENO-FM (which played top 40) until February 8, 1981.  The station's first song as KOMP (an AOR station) was The Who's "Long Live Rock".  Some of the original personalities on the station known simply as FM92 K-O-M-P included Big Marty and Leslie Blied, Todd Fowler, Dice Martin and Lark Williams.  It later became KOMP 92.3 The Rock Of Las Vegas. Other personalities included: Byrd (now with WDRV Chicago), Craig Williams, Scott "So Hot" Jameson, Charlie Morriss, Freddie Woods, Mike Dailey, Mike Culotta and JD Pig.  The station's request telephone line still uses its old slogan FM-92.

Programming
Now the station's slogan is "KOMP 92.3, The Rock Station".

The station launched BS in the Morning, in the summer of 2014 with radio host Sparks who comes to Vegas from Cleveland. The show features: Sparks, Graig Salerno, Izzy  and loyal listeners which they call the "5th Man". BS in the Morning show staples consist of The Wheel of Punishment, the BS Drunk Line, and I Heard That. The show celebrated getting the 5th Man its own official day, August 5, 2019, in the City of Las Vegas as declared by Mayor Carolyn Goodman.

Other personalities include Gooch and Dennis Huff (formerly of KVGS 107.9).  KOMP is owned by Lotus Communications, which also owns KENO 1460, KLAV 1230, KKGK 1340, KRLV 920, KWID 101.9, KWWN 1100, and KXPT 97.1. In 2011, KOMP celebrated its 30th anniversary in the album rock format.

Specialty shows include Rock Hard with Kristen, a 1-hour metal show Saturday nights at midnight. 92 Minutes of Hair with Mel, Sunday mornings.  The show was originally 92 minutes, but expanded to 2 hours of ’80s’ hair bands.  On Sunday nights, Laurie Steele voices The Home Grown Show, a show playing material from up-and-coming local artists.

The now-deceased lead vocalist for Quiet Riot, Kevin DuBrow, co-hosted  the morning radio show with long-time morning show host Craig Williams.

KOMP is the flagship station for the Las Vegas Raiders of the National Football League alongside sister station KRLV.

References

External links

OMP (FM)
Album-oriented rock radio stations in the United States
Radio stations established in 1981
Lotus Communications stations